Kim Jong-chol (born 19 April 1991) is a North Korean footballer. He represented North Korea on at least three occasions in 2016.

Career statistics

International

References

1991 births
Living people
Sportspeople from Pyongyang
North Korean footballers
North Korea international footballers
Association football midfielders
April 25 Sports Club players